Phek District (pron:/ˈfɛk/) is a district in the Indian state of Nagaland. At , the district is the seventh-most populous district in Nagaland and 596th most populous district in India with 163,418 inhabitants. The district is home to 8.26% population of Nagaland. The district headquarter is located at Phek, 120 kilometres from Kohima, the capital of Nagaland and the largest urban centre is Pfütsero.

History
Phek District was established in 1973 when it was carved out of the erstwhile Kohima District. The name Phek comes from the word Phekrekedze, meaning watchtower. The Government of Nagaland approved Phek as a full-fledged district on 19 December 1973. The district has 14 subdivisions, namely, Pfütsero, Phek Sadar, Chetheba, Chozuba, Meluri, Chizami, Sekrüzu, Razieba, Sakraba, Zuketsa, Phor, Khuza, Khezhakeno and Phokhungri.

Geography
Phek District is a mountainous region rich in flora and fauna with 70% of its land covered in evergreen forest. The district HQ town of Phek lies at the lowest altitude of the district at 1,524m above sea level, with the town of Pfütsero at the highest point 2,136m above.

The largest rivers of the district are the Tizu, Lanyi, Arachu, and the three most important lakes are the Shilloi, Chida and Dzüdü.
, of its 89 recognized villages, twelve were not accessible by road at all, and of the rest, only 24 were accessible by "all-weather roads". Only 9 of the 89 villages were still to be connected to the water supply.

Avakhung International Border Checkpost, also known as Avankhu in Phek district of Nagaland, is an International Border Checkpost on India–Myanmar barrier and a highway is being developed as part of the Bharatmala project (2017-2022).

Climate
The summers are moderately warm with the average temperature being 27°C without exceeding 32°C. Monsoon starts towards the end of May and is over by the end of September. Winters are cold, in comparison to the nearby plains of Assam, with the temperature dropping to 0°C in the coldest months of January and February.

The average annual rainfall is 1,527 mm.

Administration
The Deputy Commissioner's office is located in Phek. The current Deputy Commissioner of the district is Razouvolie Dozo. The district is split into 14 administrative circles, in which Additional Deputy Commissioner (ADC) headquarters are located in Pfütsero, Chozuba and Meluri. A Sub-Divisional Officer (SDO) is located in Chizami and Extra Assistant Commissioner (EAC) headquarters are located in Sakraba, Sekrüzu, Phokhungri, Khezhakeno, Chetheba, Khuza, Zuketsa, Phor, Lephory and Razeba.

Demographics

 the 2011 census Phek district has a population of 163,418, roughly equal to the nation of Saint Lucia. This gives it a ranking of 596th in India (out of a total of 640). Phek has a sex ratio of 951 females for every 1000 males, and a literacy rate of 78.05%.

The district is the home of the Chakhesang and Pochury tribes.

Religion
Christianity is the religion of 97% of the inhabitants. Other religions followed are Hinduism by 2% of the population, Islam by 0.6%, Buddhism by 0.2%, and a few Jains and Sikhs.

Languages
The following Angami–Pochuri languages are spoken in Phek district.

Chokri language
Kheza language
Pochuri language
Poula language

Culture
The festivals of Sükhrünyie, Yemshe, Tsükhrünyie and Nazhü are celebrated in Phek District.

Towns and villages
 the 2011 census, the district holds two towns, Phek and Pfütsero, and 117 villages, divided into fourteen admin circles as follows:

Government and politics
The district has five Vidhan Sabha Constituences, namely, Pfütsero, Chizami, Chozuba, Phek and Meluri. The last elections were held in 2018. The next legislative assembly election will be held in 2023.

As part of Lok Sabha, Phek district is part of the Nagaland Lok Sabha constituency. In the 2019 Indian general election, Tokheho Yepthomi of the NDPP won by 16,000 votes over his rival K.L. Chishi of the Indian National Congress. The next general election is in 2024.

Economy

Agriculture is the main occupation with Terrace Rice Cultivation (TRC) as the most predominant throughout Phek district. Shifting cultivation or Jhum Cultivation is a common practice. Important crops produced in the district include rice, maize and millet.

Manufacturing here includes production of salt in Meluri, fruit juice production, weaving, bamboo and wood carving.

Health
The healthcare sector comprises one hospital, two community health centres and eight primary health centres.

Education
The education sector comprises 116 primary schools, 46 middle schools, 18 high schools plus one higher secondary school, and three colleges. The literacy rate of the district is 78.05%.

Colleges
Baptist Theological College, Pfütsero
District Institute of Education and Training (DIET), Phek
Pfutsero Government College, Pfütsero
Phek Government College, Phek

Tourism

Phek District has numerous tourist attractions to visit and explore. Below are few of the tourist attractions in the district:

Lake Shilloi 

Shilloi, also referred to as The Lake of Spirits. It is the largest natural lake in Nagaland.

Kapamüdzü 

Khezhakeno 

Khezhakeno Village is considered to be the ancestral home of many Naga ethnic groups.

Glory Peak 
Glory Peak is a peak located in Pfütsero, the highest altitude settlement in Nagaland.

Terapimithu 
Terapimithu is a peak standing at

Transportation

Air
The nearest airport is Dimapur Airport in Nagaland located 193 kilometres from district headquarters Phek. There is a helipad in Phek as well.

Rail
The nearest railway station is Chümoukedima Shokhuvi Railway Station located 200 kilometres from the district headquarters at Phek.

Road
The district is well-connected with roads. The NH 29, NH 202 and NH 702A passes through the district alongside other intra-district roads.

See also
Chakhesang Naga
Chakhesang language

References

External links
 Official site
 Nagaland Tourism
 Phek Tourism
 How To Reach Phek

 
Districts of Nagaland
1973 establishments in Nagaland
India–Myanmar border crossings